Lycée Dumont d'Urville is a senior high school/sixth form college in Maurepas, Yvelines, France in the Paris metropolitan area; it serves Maurepas and Élancourt.

References

External links
 Home page 

Lycées in Yvelines